Khaled Yassin al-Obaidi (born 1959) is an Iraqi politician who served as the defense minister of Iraq from 2014 to 2016.

Background
Khalid Yassin al-Obaidi is a Sunni Muslim who was born in Mosul. He belongs to the al-Obaidi Sunni tribal confederation. al-Obaidi is a member of the Iraqi parliament's Itihad al-Quwa al-Wataniyah bloc. He holds two master's degree in engineering and military science as well as a doctorate in political science. He served in the Iraqi Air Force, specialising in engineering aircraft engines until 2003 when he was appointed as a university professor by the Ministry of Higher Education. He was appointed as the Technical Education Authority by the Ministry of Education in 2007 and has also served as a security advisor for the President of the Parliament. He was nominated for the post of Defense Minister and accepted by the Prime Minister Nouri Al-Maliki in 2010 but was rejected by Ayad Allawi, the Iraqi National List founder. He was also a major general in the Iraqi Army.

Defence Minister 
On 18 October 2014, he was appointed as the Defence Minister of Iraq. In August 2016, al-Obeidi was voted out of power through a no-confidence vote in the parliament, with majority of lawmakers voting against him over allegations of corruption. He is the first incumbent defence minister to receive a no-confidence vote in Iraq after the invasion of Iraq in 2003. Othman Ghanm was appointed to succeed him as the interim Defence Minister by the Iraqi government on 29 August 2016.

Later career

In December 2017 an MP reported that an arrest warrant had been issued for al-Obaidi. Warrants were issued for 48 defence officials in total, including the air force commander.

al-Obaidi later shifted to the Azem Alliance. Prime Minister Mustafa Al-Kadhimi appointed him as the head of the operations section of the Iraqi National Intelligence Service on 14 September 2020.

References

Living people
1959 births
People from Mosul
Government ministers of Iraq
University of Belgrade alumni